The 2014-15 Israeli Basketball State Cup was the 55th edition of the Israeli Basketball State Cup, organized by the Israel Basketball Association.

First round

Round of 16

Quarterfinals

Bracket

Semifinals

FInal

See also
2014–15 Israeli Basketball Super League
Israeli Basketball State Cup

2014-15
State Cup